Acheilognathus taenianalis is a species of ray-finned fish in the genus Acheilognathus. It is endemic to China.

References

Acheilognathus
Fish described in 1873
Taxa named by Albert Günther
Freshwater fish of China